The Feldhockey Bundesliga is the top level of men's field hockey in Germany and is managed by the German Hockey Federation. The league currently ranks first in the men's European league rankings. It was established in 1937.

Format
The season starts in August or September and is interrupted by the indoor hockey season from November to March. From April the outdoor season will be continued. Since the 2011–12 season the league was played by twelve teams who played each other twice and who competed for four spots in the championship play-offs. The number one and four and the number two and three played each other in the semi-final and winners qualified for the final where the winner was crowned champion. The two last-placed teams were relegated to the 2nd Bundesliga. 

For the 2019–20 season the German Hockey Federation introduced a new format. The league is played by twelve teams grouped in two pools of six (Pool A and Pool B) based on the previous season's ranking. The teams of the same pool compete 2 times and face the teams of the other pool once. The first four of each pool are qualified for the play-offs and the last two of each pool play the play-downs.

The quarter-finals of the play-offs are played in best-of-2 according to the following scheme:
 Series 1: 1A/4B
 Series 2: 2B/3A
 Series 3: 1B/4A
 Series 4: 2A/3B

Finals

Champions

By club

By state

See also
Women's Feldhockey Bundesliga
German Hockey Federation

Notes

References

External links
Official website
Feldhockey Bundesliga at Hockey.de

 
Men's field hockey leagues in Europe
Bundesliga
Field hockey
Sports leagues established in 1937
1937 establishments in Germany
Professional sports leagues in Germany